Joginder Nagar railway station is a railway station serving Joginder Nagar town, Himachal Pradesh in India. The station lies in the Kangra Valley Railway and under Firozpur railway division of Northern Railway zone of Indian Railways.It is a small railway station in Joginder Nagar in Mandi district of Himachal Pradesh.

It is located at 1189 m above sea level and has one platform. As of 2016, three trains halt at this station.

Trains

Up and downs trains-
Joginder Nagar–Pathankot
Joginder Nagar–Pathankot 
Joginder Nagar–Pathankot
Pathankot–Joginder Nagar
Pathankot–Joginder Nagar
Pathankot–Joginder Nagar

History
The whole line was made by British because of the Shanan Hydropower project in Joginder Nagar. Thus the railway station of Joginder Nagar was created in 1929.. After independence of India from British empire, the was heavily used by the government of India due lack of roads and other infrastructure. The track remained the main connection for Himachal Pradesh and the hilly areas till around the 1970s. With the introduction of roads its importance started to decline.

Modification

On 22 Dec 2018, Railway Minister Piyush Goyal that he has asked ministry officials to explore possibilities to reduce the journey time between Joginder Nagar station in Himachal Pradesh and Pathankot station in Punjab by three hours. After an aerial survey of the section with Himachal Pradesh Chief Minister Jai Ram Thakur, Goyal said, "I was surprised to know that this 164-km journey takes nine hours". He has ordered the railway authorities in Dharamshala to conduct a fresh survey of the route to "reduce this nine-hour tiring journey to a moderate six-hour journey".
He said he has asked the Railway Board to build new transparent vistadome coaches, used in European trains, to allow passengers on the route to have a wider scenic view of the region.
The Union minister said old rail lines on Pathankot–Joginder Nagar route will be replaced and free wi-fi facility will be made available at 17 major stations on the section. Goyal said the improvements will help the region attract more tourists. The railways and the state government will work together to encourage film shootings on these tracks, he said. Kangra valley stations will be upgraded to give it a heritage look.

Gallery

See also
 Palampur Himachal railway station
 Kangra railway station
 Jawalamukhi Road railway station
 Pathankot Junction railway station

References

Firozpur railway division
Jogindernagar
Railway stations in Mandi district
Railway stations opened in 1929

British-era buildings in Himachal Pradesh